Edgar Antonio André (born 28 June 1999) is a professional footballer who plays as a midfielder for Swiss club [[FC Sion. Born in Switzerland, he represents the Angola national team.

Professional career
André made his professional debut with Sion in a 3–1 Swiss Super League loss to Luzern 20 October 2019.

On 30 August 2021, he joined Bellinzona on loan.

International career
Born in Switzerland, André is of Angolan descent. André made his debut for the senior Angola national football team on 13 October 2020 as a 66th minute substitution during a friendly match against Mozambique.

References

External links
 
 SFL Profile
 Sport.de Profile

1999 births
Swiss people of Angolan descent
Swiss sportspeople of African descent
People from Sion, Switzerland
Living people
Swiss men's footballers
Angolan footballers
Angola international footballers
Association football midfielders
FC Sion players
Neuchâtel Xamax FCS players
AC Bellinzona players
Swiss Promotion League players
2. Liga Interregional players
Swiss Super League players
Swiss Challenge League players
Sportspeople from Valais